Jamaica Inn is a 1939 British adventure thriller film directed by Alfred Hitchcock and adapted from Daphne du Maurier's 1936 novel of the same name. It is the first of three of du Maurier's works that Hitchcock adapted (the others were her novel Rebecca and short story "The Birds"). It stars Charles Laughton and Maureen O'Hara in her first major screen role. It is the last film Hitchcock made in the United Kingdom before he moved to the United States.

The film is a period piece set in Cornwall in 1820, in the real Jamaica Inn (which still exists) on the edge of Bodmin Moor.

Plot
The film is set in 1820 (at the start of the reign of King George IV, as mentioned by Pengallan in his first scene).

Over and above its function as a hostelry, Jamaica Inn houses the clandestine rural headquarters of a gang of cut-throats and thieves, led by innkeeper Joss Merlyn. They have become wreckers. They are responsible for a series of engineered shipwrecks in which they extinguish coastal warning beacons, causing ships to run aground on the rocky Cornish coast. They then kill the surviving sailors and steal their cargo.

One evening, a young Irish-woman, Mary Yellan, is dropped off by coach near the inn, at the home of the local squire and justice of the peace, Sir Humphrey Pengallan. She requests the loan of a horse so she can ride to Jamaica Inn to re-unite with her Aunt Patience (the wife of Joss Merlyn). Despite Pengallan's warnings, she intends to live at Jamaica Inn with her late mother's sister. It transpires that Pengallan is the secret criminal mastermind behind the wrecking gang; he learns from his well-to-do friends and acquaintances when well-laden ships are passing near the coast, determines when and where the wrecks are to be caused, and fences the stolen cargo. He uses the lion's share of the proceeds to support his lavish lifestyle and passes a small fraction of them to Joss and the gang.

In another part of the inn, the gang convenes to discuss why they get so little money for their efforts. They suspect Jem Trehearne, a gang member for only two months, of embezzling goods. They hang him from one of the rafters of the inn, but when they leave, Mary cuts the rope and saves his life. Trehearne and Mary flee the gang by hiding in a cave that is only accessible by a row boat. The next morning the boat drifts away and their location is discovered. They narrowly avoid capture by swimming for their lives. After reaching the shore they seek the protection of Pengallan, unaware that he is the gang's benefactor. Trehearne reveals to Pengallan that he is actually an undercover law-officer on a mission to investigate the wrecks. Pengallan is alarmed but maintains his composure and pretends to join forces with Trehearne. Mary overhears their conversation and goes to the inn to warn Patience that she must flee in order to avoid being arrested as an accomplice. However, Patience refuses to leave her husband.

Meanwhile, Pengallan learns of a ship full of precious cargo which is due to pass the local coastline. He informs Joss and the gang, who go to the beach, and there extinguish the coastal warning beacon, as they wait for the ship to appear. However, Mary re-lights the warning beacon, and the ship's crew avoid the treacherous rocks and sail by unharmed. The gang angrily resolves to kill Mary as revenge for preventing the wreck, but Joss, who has developed a reluctant admiration for her, rescues her and the two escape by horse-cart. Joss is shot in the back and collapses when they reach Jamaica Inn. As Patience is about to tell Mary that Pengallan is the secret leader of the wrecking gang, Pengallan shoots and kills Patience from off-camera. Joss dies of his wound as well. Pengallan then takes Mary hostage, ties and gags her, and tells her that he plans to keep her now that she has no one else in the world. He drives her, still tied up and covered by a heavy cloak, to the harbour, where they board a large ship going to France.

Back at Jamaica Inn, Trehearne and a dozen soldiers take Joss's gang into custody. Trehearne then rides to the harbour to rescue Mary and capture Pengallan, who attempts to escape. During the chase, he climbs to the top of the ship's mast, from which he jumps to his death, shouting "Make way for Pengallan!"

Cast

 Charles Laughton as Sir Humphrey Pengallan
 Leslie Banks as Joss Merlyn
 Maureen O'Hara as Mary Yellen
 Robert Newton as James 'Jem' Trehearne - Sir Humphrey's Gang
 Marie Ney as Patience Merlyn
 Horace Hodges as Butler (Chadwick)
 Hay Petrie as Groom (Sam) 
 Frederick Piper as Agent (Davis)
 Herbert Lomas as Tenant (Dowland)
 Clare Greet as Tenant (Granny Tremarney)
 William Devlin as Tenant (Burdkin)
 Emlyn Williams as Harry the Pedlar - Sir Humphrey's Gang
 Jeanne de Casalis as Sir Humphrey's friend
 Mabel Terry-Lewis as Lady Beston
 A. Bromley Davenport as Ringwood (credited as Bromley Davenport)
 George Curzon as Captain Murray
 Basil Radford as Lord George
 Wylie Watson as Salvation Watkins - Sir Humphrey's Gang
 Morland Graham as Sea Lawyer Sydney - Sir Humphrey's Gang 
 Edwin Greenwood as Dandy - Sir Humphrey's Gang 
 Mervyn Johns as Thomas - Sir Humphrey's Gang 
 Stephen Haggard as The Boy, Willie Penhale - Sir Humphrey's Gang 
 John Longden as Captain Johnson (uncredited) 
 Aubrey Mather as Coachman (uncredited)

Character actors
Besides Laughton and O'Hara, several secondary characters are played by notable stage-and-screen character actors of the time, including "bruiser-type" actor Leslie Banks (who played Count Zaroff in The Most Dangerous Game) as Joss Merlyn; and Robert Newton as Jem Trehearne, a suave young secret-police agent.

Production

Charles Laughton was a co-producer on this movie, and he reportedly interfered greatly with Hitchcock's direction. Laughton initially was cast as Joss, but he cast himself in the role of the villainous Pengallan, who originally was a hypocritical preacher but was rewritten as a squire because unsympathetic portrayals of the clergy were forbidden by the Production Code in Hollywood. Sidney Gilliat did these rewrites as a favour to Hitchcok.

Laughton then demanded that Hitchcock give his character greater screen time. This forced Hitchcock to reveal that Pengallan was a villain in league with the smugglers earlier in the film than Hitchcock had initially planned.

Laughton's acting was a problem point as well for Hitchcock. Laughton portrayed Pengallan as having a mincing walk that went to the beat of a German waltz that he played in his head, and Hitchcock thought it was out of character. Laughton also demanded that Maureen O'Hara be given the lead after watching her screen test (her acting in the screen test was sub par, but Laughton could not forget her eyes). After filming finished, Laughton brought her to Hollywood to play Esmeralda opposite his Quasimodo in the hit 1939 version of The Hunchback of Notre Dame, after which she became an international star.

On release, the film was a substantial commercial success and in March 1939 Hitchcock moved to Hollywood to begin his contract with David O. Selznick. Thus Jamaica Inn  was his last  picture made in Britain until the 1970s.

Credits
 Director - Alfred Hitchcock
 Producer - Erich Pommer 
 Writers - Sidney Gilliat (screenplay and dialogue), Joan Harrison (screenplay), J. B. Priestley (additional dialogue), Daphne du Maurier (underlying novel)
 Cinematography - Harry Stradling and Bernard Knowles (photography)
 Continuity - Alma Reville
 Art direction - Tom Morahan (settings)
 Costumes - Molly McArthur
 Music - Eric Fenby (music); Frederic Lewis (musical director)
 Sound - Jack Rogerson 
 Film editor - Robert Hamer
 Special effects - Harry Watt
 Makeup artist - Ern Westmore
 Production manager - Hugh Perceval

Reception
Many critics were somewhat disparaging of the film, largely because of the lack of atmosphere and tension which was present in the book. The film's light-hearted, often camp, banter and portly landlord, were seen as being too far removed from the darker characters, sinister inn and coastline depicted in du Maurier's story. Today it is often considered to be one of Hitchcock's "lesser" works. Hitchcock expressed his disappointment with the film even before it was finished, stating that it was a "completely absurd" idea. However, the film still garnered a large profit (US$3.7 million, a huge success at the time) at the box office.
Daphne du Maurier was not pleased with the finished production and for a while she considered withholding the film rights to Rebecca. In 1978, film critic Michael Medved gave Jamaica Inn a place in his book The Fifty Worst Films of All Time, but this was based on a viewing of a poor quality and incomplete US print, the only copy available at the time.

Copyright and home video status
Jamaica Inn, like all of Hitchcock's British films, is copyrighted worldwide but has been heavily bootlegged on home video. Despite this, various licensed, restored releases have appeared on DVD, Blu-ray and video on demand services from Network Distributing and Arrow Films in the UK, the Cohen Film Collection in the US and many others.

References

External links 
 
 
 
 
 
 
 Alfred Hitchcock Collectors’ Guide: Jamaica Inn at Brenton Film

1939 films
1939 adventure films
1930s crime films
British adventure films
1930s English-language films
British black-and-white films
Films based on British novels
Films based on works by Daphne du Maurier
Films set in Cornwall
Films set in hotels
Films set in the 1810s
Films shot at Associated British Studios
Films directed by Alfred Hitchcock
Films with screenplays by J. B. Priestley
Fiction set in 1819
Films produced by Erich Pommer
1930s British films